Segmental blood pressure is used to measure actual limb blood pressures. The purpose of these measurements is to look at arterial occlusion.

In the leg pressures are measured at the ankle, below the knee, above  the knee and mid-thigh.  In the arm pressures are measured at the wrist, below the elbow, above the elbow and mid upper arm.

References

Blood pressure